Ende Gelände 2017 was a large civil disobedience protest movement in Germany to limit global warming through fossil fuel phase-out.

- environmental activists from several countries blocked two German open-pit coal mines:
 From 24 to 29 August 2017, about  persons blocked a mine owned by RWE in the Rhineland coalfields.

 On 5 November 2017 (for the 2017 United Nations Climate Change Conference), around  persons blocked the Hambach lignite mine.

Context 
On 15 August 2015, in the first year of Ende Gelände,  activists blocked the Garzweiler surface mine owned by RWE (Ende Gelände 2015).

On 13 to 15 May 2016, with Ende Gelände 2016,  activists blocked the Welzow-Süd open-pit coal mine and the coal-fired Schwarze Pumpe power station, then owned by Vattenfall (Spremberg).

Gallery

See also 
 Climate disobedience
 Climate justice
 Energy transition (in Germany)
 Ende Gelände
 Ende Gelände 2016
 Ende Gelände 2018
 Fossil fuel divestment
 Hambach Forest

References

External links 
 Official website

2017 in Germany
2017 in the environment
2017 protests
Occupations (protest)
Climate change in Germany
Climate change policy
Coal mining
Coal in Germany
Demonstrations
Direct action
Environmental protests in Germany
Mining in Germany
RWE
Surface mining